Esterio Caraballo (born 1913) was a Cuban outfielder in the Negro leagues who played in the 1930s.

A native of Palma Soriano, Cuba, Caraballo made his Negro leagues debut in 1937 with the Cuban Stars (East). He went on to play for the New York Cubans in 1939.

References

External links
 and Baseball-Reference Black Baseball stats and Seamheads

1913 births
Date of birth missing
Year of death missing
Cuban Stars (East) players
New York Cubans players
Cuban baseball players
Baseball outfielders
People from Palma Soriano